El Amparo is a 2016 film directed by Rober Calzadilla and coproduced between Colombia and Venezuela. The film is set in El Amparo, a Venezuelan location on the shores of Arauca River, in the Colombian border, based in the 1988 Massacre of El Amparo, where the Venezuelan army killed several fishermen, accusing them of being Colombian guerillas.

The film premiered as the opening film of the 2016 AFI Latin American Film Festival. In was screened at Colombian theaters on 28 November 2019.

The film was Venezuela's candidate for the Goya Award for Best Iberoamerican Film in 2018.

Plot 
In El Amparo, in the Venezuelan border location with Colombia, two men survive an armed attack perpetrated in the Arauca River, where fourteen of their colleagues were killed. The army accuses them of being Colombian guerrillas, intimidates them and tries to take them away from their cell where they are guarded by a local policeman and the locals, who desperately try to prevent them from being taken away. The men say that they are simple fishermen, but the pressure for them to yield to the official version is overwhelming.

Cast 
 Giovanny García
 Vicente Quintero
 Samantha Castillo
 Vicente Peña
 Rossana Hernández
 Patrizia Fusco

Reception 
El Amparo was awarded with the Best Film and Best Screenplay São Paulo International Film Festival, the Audience Award in the Bogotá, Milan and Biarritz film festivals and the Best Film Award in the Venezuela and Marseilles festivals.

References

External links 
 
 El amparo

2010s Spanish-language films
2016 films
2016 drama films
Colombian drama films
Venezuelan drama films
Massacre of El Amparo
2010s Colombian films